Five male athletes from the United Arab Emirates competed at the 1996 Summer Paralympics in Atlanta, United States.

See also
United Arab Emirates at the Paralympics
United Arab Emirates at the 1996 Summer Olympics

References 

Nations at the 1996 Summer Paralympics
1996
Summer Paralympics